Lehigh Senior High School is located in Lehigh Acres, Florida, a suburb of Fort Myers. It is one of the largest high schools in Lee County. The current principal is Jackie Corey. It is part of the Lee County School District. Lehigh currently has the highest percent of incoming students in Lee County. It is commonly referred to as "The Center of the Arts", being that it is recognized as one by the local school district for its zone. In addition to Lehigh Senior's dedication to the arts, it also offers dual enrollment classes that allow students to earn college credits for free through Edison State College. It is also now recognized as of 2008 as a University of Cambridge International School and also offers programs called AVID and Advanced Placement.

Statistics 
As of the 2014–15 school year, the school had an enrollment of 1,884 students and 102.0 classroom teachers (on an FTE basis), for a student–teacher ratio of 18.5:1. There were 1,345 students (71.4% of enrollment) eligible for free lunch and 181 (9.6% of students) eligible for reduced-cost lunch.

As of 2014–15, the school's population is 47% Hispanic, 34% Black, 15% Caucasian, and 4% Other.
In 2007, the school achieved the highest graduation rate in its history. 
In 2008, the school's JROTC program was one of the top 10% programs in the nation.
The school has 1,408 enrolled students with around 74 teachers, as of 2010.

Notable alumni
Phillip Buchanon: Cornerback for the Detroit Lions
Mario Henderson: Tackle for the Oakland Raiders
Jeremy Ware, Cornerback for the Oakland Raiders
Steven Gachette: Quarterback for the Kansas City Command
Austin Carlile: Of Mice & Men, lead vocals
Erick McIntosh: American football player
 Reconcile (rapper) (Ronnie Lillard)
Robert Jackson: NFL player

References

External links
 Official School Site

High schools in Lee County, Florida
Public high schools in Florida
Magnet schools in Florida